Scotland's national performing arts companies are directly funded by the Scottish Government.  In the country's performing arts circles, they are often referred to as the Big Five.

 Scottish Ballet
 Scottish Opera
 Royal Scottish National Orchestra
 Scottish Chamber Orchestra
 National Theatre of Scotland

References

 
Scottish culture
Arts in Scotland